The 2022 season was Negeri Sembilan's 99th year in their history and 10th season in Malaysia Super League since it was first introduced in 2004. Also it was the first season in the Malaysia Super League since relegated to Malaysia Premier League in 2018. Along with the league, the club also compete in the Malaysia Cup and Malaysia FA Cup in 2022.

Events 
On Disember 2021, the club signed several new players. Among them were K. Sarkunan, Syihan Hazmi, Hérold Goulon, Matheus Alves, David Mawutor, Khuzaimi Pie, A. Namathevan, Izzuddin Roslan, Khair Jones, Che Rashid Che Halim, Sean Selvaraj, Gustavo, Izaffiq Ruzi, Hariz Kamarudin, Omid Nazari, Kossi Adetu.

Negeri Sembilan FC performed brilliantly by successfully creating an unbeaten record throughout the 6 Malaysia Super League games since the league started. Negeri Sembilan FC managed to be at the top of the league for a week. On 11 May 2022 their clean sheet was broken by the Johor Darul Ta'zim FC team after the Negeri Sembilan FC team was defeated with a result of 1-0.

On 13 June 2022, two foreign players, David Mawutor and Kossi Adetu has been replaced with Gustavo and Yashir Pinto during mid season transfer.

Players

Current squad

Transfers

In pre-season

In mid-season

Out pre-season

Out mid-season

Competitions

Malaysia Premier League

League table

Results by round

Matches

Malaysia Cup

Round of 16 
Negeri Sembilan FC won against Kedah Darul Aman F.C. on 26 October 2022.

|}

Quarter-final 
Negeri Sembilan FC lose against Selangor F.C. on 12 November 2022.

|}

Malaysia FA Cup

First round
The draw for the first round was held on 23 February 2022. The matches were held between 11 March and 29 April.

Negeri Sembilan FC lose against Terengganu on 29 April 2022.

Statistics

Appearances and goals 

|-
! colspan="16" style="background:#dcdcdc; text-align:center"| Players transferred out during the season
|-

|}

Clean sheets

References 

Negeri Sembilan FC
Negeri Sembilan FA seasons
2022 in Malaysian football
Negeri Sembilan